Yela Ka Forest is a conservation area of ka trees (Terminalia carolinensis) in the Yela Valley on the island of Kosrae in the Federated States of Micronesia. The trees are also found on the island of Pohnpei. A conservation easement, the first achieved outside the Americas, protects 78 acres of the 1,400 acre valley.

References

Further reading
"Enchanted Forest", article in The Nature Conservancy Magazine 
Yela Valley, Kosrae Island, Federated States of Micronesia January 2011 Seacology

Environment of the Federated States of Micronesia
Parks in the Federated States of Micronesia